Van der Giessen de Noord was a shipbuilding company that mainly built ferries, located in Krimpen aan den IJssel, a town in the western Netherlands.  The yard was especially suited to the construction of large vessels due to its developed undercover facilities.

Owned by IHC Caland (now SBM Offshore), the yard went into liquidation in October 2003 primarily due to aggressive competition from other parts of the world such as South Korea.  It had not received any orders for new vessels since 2000.

Deliveries

Companies based in South Holland
Shipbuilding companies of the Netherlands
Manufacturing companies established in 1884
Manufacturing companies disestablished in 2003
Dutch companies established in 1884
Dutch companies disestablished in 2003